Anamera obesa is a species of beetle in the family Cerambycidae. It was described by Maurice Pic in 1928. It is known from Myanmar, Laos and Vietnam.

References

Lamiini
Beetles described in 1928